Dominic Napare (born November 3, 1960) is a Ghanaian politician and member of the Seventh Parliament of the Fourth Republic of Ghana and member of the Eighth Parliament of the Fourth Republic of Ghana representing the Sene East Constituency in the Bono East Region on the ticket of the National Democratic Congress.

Personal life 
Napare is a Christian (Catholic). He is married (with four children).

Early life and education 
Napare was born on November 3, 1960. He hails from Kajaji, a town in the Bono East Region of Ghana. He entered University of Education, Winneba and obtained his Bachelor of Education degree in Management and Secretarial Studies.

Politics 
Napare is a member of the National Democratic Congress (NDC). In 2012, he contested for the Sene East seat on the ticket of the NDC sixth parliament of the fourth republic and won.

2020 elections 
Napare was again elected member of parliament for Sene East in the 2020 December parliamentary elections. He was declared winner in the parliamentary elections after obtaining 13,401 votes representing 64.4% against his closest contender the New Patriotic Party candidate Luchoun Nicholas Bitagan of who had 7,424 votes representing 35.7%.

Committees 
Napare is the Vice Chairperson of the Poverty Reduction Strategy Committee; member of the House Committee; member of the Privileges Committee; and also a member of the Local Government and Rural Development Committee.

Employment 
 District Chief Executive (DCE) (Sene East District), 28 April 2009 to 2012.
 Member of Parliament (January 7, 2013 – present; 2nd term)
 Educationist

Philanthropy 
In 2021, he presented motorcycles to 3 police stations in his constituency.

References 

Ghanaian MPs 2017–2021
1960 births
Living people
National Democratic Congress (Ghana) politicians
Ghanaian MPs 2021–2025
Ghanaian MPs 2013–2017